Gonocausta is a genus of moths of the family Crambidae. The genus was first described by Julius Lederer in 1863.

Species
Gonocausta sabinalis Dyar, 1914
Gonocausta simulata (Druce, 1902)
Gonocausta vestigialis Snellen, 1890
Gonocausta voralis (Schaus, 1920)
Gonocausta zephyralis Lederer, 1863

References

Spilomelinae
Crambidae genera
Taxa named by Julius Lederer